Nicolae Manolescu (b. 27 November 1939, Râmnicu Vâlcea) is a Romanian literary critic. As an editor of România Literară literary magazine, he has reached a record in reviewing books for almost 30 years. Elected a corresponding member of the Romanian Academy in 1997, he was upgraded to titular member in 2013.

During the civil unrest of the 1960s, because of critical opinions voiced against Gheorghe Gheorghiu Dej and the Romanian Communist regime, he was expelled from the University of Bucharest, where he was studying philology.

After the Romanian Revolution of 1989, he was a founding member of the Civic Alliance (AC) in November 1990, and, after July 1991, began a political career as leader of the minor Civic Alliance Party (PAC), a group that had split from the Alliance to pursue a more political activism, being its candidate for presidency in the 1992 elections; Manolescu subsequently represented the party in the Senate. In 1993 Nicolae Manolescu was a leader of a short lived PNL, a Romanian political party which in 1998 had merged with the National Liberal Party (PNL). Prior to its merger, Manolescu was its leader during the 1996 Romanian general election; as the party's presidential candidate, he finished ninth with 0.7% of the vote. Until 2000, he was a member of the PNL National Council, when he resigned from this position and retreated from political life.

Manolescu has published over 40 volumes on Romanian literature, the most acclaimed being A Critical History of Romanian Literature (vol.1) and a history of Romanian novels, entitled Arca lui Noe. His distinction between "doric", "ionic", and "corinthic" novels originated in the traditional orders of the columns of Ancient Greek temples, and covers the distinction between realistic, psychological first person narratives and contemporary, postmodern novels. He has also been the host of the popular Profesiunea mea, cultura ("My Profession Is Culture"), a talk show on cultural matters, aired by Pro TV between 1998 and 2001.

He is a professor at the University of Bucharest, from which he has received a Ph.D. in Letters. He is the President of the Romanian Writers' Union, and was designated the Romanian ambassador to UNESCO in 2006.

References

1939 births
Living people
Titular members of the Romanian Academy
Romanian literary critics
Romanian literary historians
Romanian magazine editors
Leaders of political parties in Romania
Candidates for President of Romania
Members of the Senate of Romania
National Liberal Party (Romania) politicians
Permanent Delegates of Romania to UNESCO
People from Râmnicu Vâlcea
University of Bucharest alumni
Academic staff of the University of Bucharest
România Literară editors